Quilalí is a town and a municipality in the Nueva Segovia Department of Nicaragua.

Community Background
Situated in a high mountainous region of Nicaragua lies Quilalí, the remote, large municipal head in the department of Nueva Segovia. It is 264 km north of Managua and 80 km east of the departmental capitol of Ocotal. The town has a population of more than 13,000 inhabitants but in the entire municipality itself, there are nearly 30,600 people. The pueblo is made of 17 barrios laid out in a cobblestone grid around a central park and 54 rural communities. The people in Quilalí make their living primarily in basic grains farming (corn and beans) as well as coffee cultivation.

In contrast to all its soil riches, the people of Quilalí are poor. Unemployment and underemployment are high and continue to grow as the global economic slowdown sinks in deeper. Many people work in the homes of others earning a dollar a day, all that the other families can afford to pay them. Even those with coveted government jobs go months without receiving pay as the government has no money to pay them.

Goods are also more costly here than in other parts of the country. The town is isolated from its economically prosperous neighbors by rough terrain including mountains and rivers that swell to overtake the highway during rainy season, making transportation of goods to the town costly.

Families also tend to be large. According to the Ministry of Health, nearly twenty percent of the population is made up of women of birthing age. This, among other factors such as job scarcity and lack of culturally appropriate family planning methods, leads many families to have upwards of 5 children with only one parent working. The scarcity also causes many children to quit school early to help their families by finding whatever small jobs they can.

Not all families in Quilalí suffer. The people who belong to the national ruling government party, the Sandinistas, have more opportunities for employment. This is important because the local ruling government party in Quilalí is the Constitutionalist Liberal Party (Nicaragua). This means the local government provides jobs to one political party, while the national government provides jobs for the other. It also makes Quilalí one of the only towns where Sandinistas do not control local politics. This fact is due to the memory by most inhabitants of Quilali of the savagery of Sandino and his troops during their existence in the 1930s.

Festivals
Quilalí celebrates all the Nicaraguan holidays as well as some uniquely Quilalí events. As with all Nicaraguan cities, they celebrate their Patron SaintSaint Joseph in March 19. For the week before the 19th and the weekend afterwards, the town celebrates with pilgrimages to communities within Quilalí as well as the traditional hípica, or horse parade, which is traditionally held the Sunday after the 19th. Bull rings, Ferris wheels, and makeshift bars are all common sights at the Quilalí fairgrounds around the 19th.

Another Quilalí celebration takes place in the largest rural community within the municipality, San Bartolo. San Bartolo hosts the annual Corn Festival, where all things corn are celebrated, including tamales, puddings and of course, corn alcohol. All these foods are found for sale by local cooks and are judged by two or more judges (this fellow Peace Corps volunteer included). The alcohol tends to be judged by all willing male participants. The festival also features floats prepared by the local high school, a soccer tournament, and a dance benefiting the graduating class.

Climate

Sports
Baseball is also widely popular, especially during the Quilalí Municipal Championships.

Twin towns – sister cities

Quilalí is twinned with:
 Salt, Spain
 South Haven, United States

Gallery

References

Municipalities of the Nueva Segovia Department